Euchaetis metallota is a moth of the family Oecophoridae. It is found in Australia, where it has been recorded from Queensland, New South Wales, the Australian Capital Territory, Victoria, South Australia and Western Australia.

The wingspan is about 25 mm. The forewings are pale yellow with a lacey brown pattern. The hindwings are uniform yellow.

The larvae feed on Eucalyptus vernicosa. Feeding from inside a gall.

References

Moths described in 1883
Euchaetis